This is a list of municipalities in the Çukurova region of Turkey. Note that the central municipalities of Adana, Hatay and Mersin Provinces are Metropolitan Municipality, without any belde (town) municipality,

|-
|
Adana Province
Adana Metropolitan Municipality
Çukurova (in Adana)
Karaisalı (in Adana)
Sarıçam (in Adana)
Seyhan (in Adana)
Yüreğir (in Adana)
Aladağ
Ceyhan
Feke
İmamoğlu
Karaisalı
Karataş
Kozan
Pozantı
Saimbeyli
Tufanbeyli
Yumurtalık
|
Hatay Province
Hatay Metropolitan Municipality
Antakya (in Antakya)
Defne (in Antakya)	
Belen
Dörtyol	
Erzin	
Hassa	
İskenderun	
Kırıkhan	
Kumlu
Payas	
Reyhanlı	
Samandağ	
Yayladağı	
|
Mersin Province
Mersin Metropolitan Municipality
Akdeniz (in Mersin)
Mezitli (in Mersin)
Toroslar (in Mersin)
Yenişehir (in Mersin)
Anamur
Aydıncık
Bozyazı
Çamlıyayla
Erdemli
Gülnar
Mut
Silifke
Tarsus
|
Osmaniye Province
Osmaniye 
Bahçe
Düziçi
Hasanbeyli
Kadirli
Sumbas
Toprakkale
Atalan (belde)
Böcekli (belde)
Ellek (belde)
Yarbaşı (belde)
Cevdetiye (belde)
Kırmıtlı (belde)
Alibeyli (belde)
Mehmetli (belde)
Tüysüz (belde)

See also
List of municipalities in Adana Province
List of municipalities in Hatay Province
List of municipalities in Mersin Province
List of municipalities in Osmaniye Province

References

 
Cukurova